Beit Zaid ( or , lit. House of Zaid) is a moshav in northern Israel. Located near Kiryat Tiv'on, it falls under the jurisdiction of Jezreel Valley Regional Council.

History
The area was first settled in 1926 by Alexander Zaïd, one of the founders of Hashomer, his wife and four children. In 1940 a new kibbutz, Giv'ot Zaid (named for Zaïd) was founded to the north of Zaïd's former residence (he had been murdered in 1938) and was joined by several members of Zaïd's family. However, it collapsed in 1950. In 1951 the former residents of Giv'ot Zaid moved to the site inhabited by the family, and founded Beit Zaid.

References

Moshavim
Populated places established in 1951
Populated places in Northern District (Israel)
1951 establishments in Israel